Georgios Velkov (born 31 August 1994) is a Cypriot football midfielder who currently plays for PO Xylotymbou. He started his career at Nea Salamina.

Career
On 29 July 2019, Velkov returned to PO Xylotymbou.

Club statistics

References

External links

Living people
1994 births
Cypriot footballers
Nea Salamis Famagusta FC players
P.O. Xylotymbou players
Digenis Oroklinis players
People from Larnaca
Association football midfielders
Cypriot First Division players
Cypriot Second Division players